Lisette Tammik (born 14 October 1998) is an Estonian footballer who plays as a forward for Spanish Primera División club Santa Teresa CD and the Estonia women's national team.

Career
Tammik has been capped for the Estonia national team, appearing for the team during the 2019 FIFA Women's World Cup qualifying cycle.

In April 2021, it was announced that she would become the first professional player in the history of the Naiste Meistriliiga, with FC Flora stating an intention of signing an additional two to three players on paid contracts.

International goals

Honours
Flora
Naiste Meistriliiga: 2018
Estonian Women's Supercup: 2018

Napoli
Serie B: 2019–20
Serie C: 2018–19

References

External links
 
 
 
 
 

1998 births
Living people
Footballers from Tallinn
Estonian women's footballers
Women's association football forwards
Estonia women's international footballers
Estonian expatriate footballers
Estonian expatriate sportspeople in Italy
Expatriate women's footballers in Italy
Estonian expatriate sportspeople in Spain
Expatriate women's footballers in Spain
FC Flora (women) players
Santa Teresa CD players
S.S.D. Napoli Femminile players